Magixx may refer to:
 Matrixx Magixx, Dutch basketball team
 Magixx (singer), Nigerian singer and songwriter